Birky (formerly known as Birky Yanivski and Birky Dominikanski is  a village (selo) in Yavoriv Raion, Lviv Oblast (province) of Western Ukraine. It belongs to Ivano-Frankove settlement hromada, one of the hromadas of Ukraine. Population: 2203. Local government is administered by Birkivska Village Council.

Geography 
A railway Lviv - Rava-Ruska there passes through the village.

History and religion 

The settlements arose at the end of the 18th century in the area, which was surrounded by hills. Originally have settled monastics of the Dominican Order. From this came the name of the village – Birky Dominikanski, name of the village, which was until 1947. The first written mention of the village dates back to 1785.
In the village operates the Sts. Volodymyr and Olha Ukrainian Catholic Church, built in 2010.

References

External links 
 weather.in.ua, Birky (Lviv region)

Literature 
 Історія міст і сіл УРСР : Львівська область, Яворівський район, Бірки. – К. : ГРУРЕ, 1968 р. Page 925 

Villages in Yavoriv Raion